Fillet may refer to:
Annulet (architecture), part of a column capital, also called a fillet
Fillet (aircraft), a fairing smoothing the airflow at a joint between two components
Fillet (clothing), a headband
Fillet (cut), a piece of meat
Fillet (geology), a feature on the surface of the Moon
Fillet (mechanics), the filling of an interior corner
Fillet (picture framing), a small piece of moulding which fits inside a larger frame, also known as a "slip"
Fillet (redaction), editing, to cut out letters of a word or name to prevent full disclosure (e.g. "W————m P————t" for "William Pitt")
Fish fillet

See also
 Filet (disambiguation)